Jiří Doležal may refer to:
Jiří Doležal (ice hockey, born 1963), Czechoslovakian ice hockey player
Jiří Doležal (ice hockey, born 1985), Czech ice hockey player